Prince Michael of Kent,  (Michael George Charles Franklin; born 4 July 1942) is a member of the British royal family, who is 51st in the line of succession to the British throne as of September 2022. Queen Elizabeth II and Michael were first cousins through their fathers, King George VI, and Prince George, Duke of Kent. Michael's mother Princess Marina of Greece and Denmark was also a first cousin of the Queen's husband Prince Philip, Duke of Edinburgh, making him both a second cousin and first cousin once removed to King Charles III.

Prince Michael would occasionally represent Queen Elizabeth II at some functions in Commonwealth realms outside the United Kingdom during her reign. Otherwise, he manages his own consultancy business and undertakes various commercial work around the world. He has also presented some television documentaries on the royal families of Europe.

Early life
Prince Michael was born on 4 July 1942, at Coppins, Iver, Buckinghamshire. He was the third child of Prince George, Duke of Kent, who was the fourth son of King George V and Queen Mary and a younger brother of Kings Edward VIII and George VI. At the time of his birth, Michael was seventh in the line of succession to the British throne. His mother was Princess Marina, a daughter of Prince Nicholas of Greece and Denmark and Grand Duchess Elena Vladimirovna of Russia.

At his baptism on 4 August 1942 in the Private Chapel of Windsor Castle, his godparents were his paternal uncle the King; Queen Wilhelmina of the Netherlands (for whom her son-in-law Prince Bernhard stood proxy); King Haakon VII of Norway (his great-uncle); US President Franklin D. Roosevelt (for whom the Duke of Kent stood proxy); Frederica of Hanover, Hereditary Princess of Greece (who was not present), the wife of Paul of Greece, his first cousin-once-removed; Prince Henry, Duke of Gloucester (his paternal uncle, who was absent); the Dowager Marchioness of Milford Haven (his paternal first cousin twice-removed); and Lady Patricia Ramsay (his paternal first cousin twice-removed). Because of the war, newspaper reports did not identify the location of the baptism and said instead that it took place at "a private chapel in the country".

Seven weeks after Michael's birth, his father was killed in a plane crash near Dunbeath, Caithness, Scotland, on 25 August 1942.

At the age of five, Prince Michael was a page boy at the wedding of his cousins Princess Elizabeth and Lieutenant Philip Mountbatten.

Education and military service

He was educated at Sunningdale School and Eton College and is fluent in French as well as  having a "working knowledge" of German and Italian, he was the first member of the royal family to learn Russian, of which he is a qualified interpreter.

Michael was commissioned into the 11th Hussars (Prince Albert's Own) in 1963. He later served in The Royal Hussars (Prince of Wales's Own) after the amalgamation between the 11th Hussars and the 10th Royal Hussars (Prince of Wales's Own) in 1969. He saw service in Germany, Hong Kong, and Cyprus, where his squadron formed part of a United Nations peacekeeping force in 1971. Subsequent tours of duty, during a military career that spanned twenty years, included a number of appointments on the Defence Intelligence Staff. He retired from the Army with the rank of Major in 1981.

In 1994, Michael was made Honorary Commodore (later Honorary Rear Admiral and then Vice Admiral) of the Royal Naval Reserve, and in 2002, he was made Honorary Air Commodore of RAF Benson (promoted to Honorary Air Marshal in 2012). From 2009 to 2012, he was Regimental Colonel of the Honourable Artillery Company and on 31 January 2012 became its Royal Honorary Colonel. He is also Colonel-in-Chief of the Essex and Kent Scottish Regiment in Canada.

Activities and patronages

As the third child of George V's fourth son, it was not expected that Prince Michael, as the only second son in the extended royal family, would undertake many engagements on behalf of the royal family. He has performed official duties in the Commonwealth realms other than the United Kingdom and has represented the Queen abroad. 

He has, however, never received a parliamentary annuity or an allowance from the British Privy Purse, unlike both his elder brother, Prince Edward, Duke of Kent, and his sister, Princess Alexandra, who both carry out official royal duties. The Prince was given the use of a grace and favour apartment at Kensington Palace upon his marriage in 1978.

Michael represented the Queen at state funerals in India, Cyprus and Swaziland and, with his wife, Princess Michael of Kent, represented the Queen at the independence celebrations in Belize, and at the coronation of King Mswati III of Swaziland.

Michael supports a large number of charities and organisations. Some of his patronages and presidencies include: the Kennel Club, Children's Burns Trust, Maritime Volunteer Service, the Association of Dunkirk Little Ships, Life Saving Society, Royal Automobile Club, National Eye Research Centre, Motor Sports Association, Brooklands Museum Trust, the Light Aircraft Association, and the London School of Business and Finance.

He announced his retirement from public life in June 2022 as he approached his 80th birthday.

Marriage

On 30 June 1978, Michael married, at a civil ceremony, at the City Hall (Wiener Rathaus) in Vienna, Austria, the German noblewoman Baroness Marie-Christine von Reibnitz. After receiving Pope John Paul II's permission (a previous pontiff, Pope Paul VI, had barred them from having a Catholic wedding), the couple later received a blessing of their marriage in a Catholic ceremony on 29 June 1983 at Archbishop's House, London.

At the time of the marriage, Marie-Christine von Reibnitz was both a Roman Catholic and a divorcée. She had been married to the banker Thomas Troubridge; they separated in 1973, divorced in 1977, and had their marriage annulled by the Catholic Church a year later, two months before her marriage to Michael. Under the terms of the Act of Settlement 1701, Michael forfeited his place in the line of succession to the throne through his marriage to a Catholic. He was reinstated to the line of succession on 26 March 2015 with the coming into force of the Succession to the Crown Act 2013, and is 51st in line to the throne .

Michael and Marie-Christine have two children, both brought up as members of the Church of England and therefore in the line of succession to the throne since birth:

 Lord Frederick Windsor, born 6 April 1979 at St Mary's Hospital, London; married, 12 September 2009, Sophie Winkleman. Educated at Eton College and Magdalen College, Oxford. They have two daughters, Maud and Isabella.
 Lady Gabriella Kingston, born 23 April 1981 at St Mary's Hospital, London; married, 18 May 2019, Thomas Kingston. Educated at Downe House, Brown University in the US, and Linacre College, Oxford.

Personal interests

Commercial
Prince Michael manages his own consultancy business, and undertakes business throughout the world. He is also a qualified interpreter of Russian.

Masonic
Prince Michael is an active Freemason. He is the Grand Master of the Grand Lodge of Mark Master Masons, and Provincial Grand Master of the Provincial Grand Lodge of Middlesex.

Russia
 
Prince Michael speaks fluent Russian and has a strong interest in Russia, where he is a well-known figure (he is a former recipient of the Order of Friendship). Tsar Nicholas II was a first cousin of three of his grandparents: George V, Prince Nicholas of Greece and Denmark, and Grand Duchess Elena Vladimirovna of Russia. When the bodies of the Tsar and some of his family were recovered in 1991, the remains were later identified by DNA using, among others, a sample from Michael for recognition. He attended the 1998 burial of the Tsar and his family in St Petersburg. He is an honorary member of the Romanov Family Association. He is also the second cousin of Maria Vladimirovna, Grand Duchess of Russia, who is a claimant to the headship of the Imperial Family of Russia. They share the same great-grandfather, Grand Duke Vladimir Alexandrovich. Michael is the patron of organisations which have close ties with Russia, including the Russo-British Chamber of Commerce and the St Gregory's Foundation. In his capacity as patron of Children's Fire and Burns Trust, Prince Michael has led fundraising rallies in 1999 and 2003 in Russia to raise money for the charity. He also led another rally in 2005 and raised money for the Royal Marsden Hospital and Britain's Charities Aid Foundation Russia.

On 4 March 2022, Michael returned the Order of Friendship in the aftermath of the 2022 Russian invasion of Ukraine.

Sport
Prince Michael was a part of the Royal Military Academy Sandhurst rowing crew that won the Maiden Fours at Bedford in 1961. Prince Michael competed for Great Britain in the 1971 FIBT World Bobsleigh Championships but crashed and failed to finish the event. He was official non-travelling reserve for the 1972 Winter Olympics. He took part in the 1970 London to Mexico World Cup Rally in an Austin Maxi, but he and his crew failed to finish the event.

Media scrutiny
In 2002, both Michael and his wife were the subject of criticism over the rent paid on their accommodation at Kensington Palace following scrutiny by the House of Commons Public Accounts committee on the cost of royal palaces and whether they were value for money. The committee had called on the Queen to evict its residents and put the apartments on a more commercial footing. When it was claimed that the couple paid a rent of only £69 per week for the use of their apartments at Kensington Palace, Buckingham Palace announced that "The Queen is paying the rent for Prince and Princess Michael of Kent's apartment at a commercial rate of £120,000 annually, from her own private funds. This rent payment by The Queen is in recognition of the Royal engagements and work for various charities which Prince and Princess Michael of Kent have undertaken at their own expense, and without any public funding."

Prince Michael has been scrutinized for financial assistance given to him by exiled Russian oligarch Boris Berezovsky through offshore companies, with a reported total of £320,000 in payments over the period 2002–2008. In an interview with The Sunday Times, Berezovsky stated, "There is nothing underhand or improper about the financial assistance I have given Prince Michael. It is a matter between friends."

In May 2021 reports were published stating that Michael was "selling access" to Vladimir Putin's political representatives. Footage from a Zoom call was released of Michael, alongside Simon Isaacs, 4th Marquess of Reading, interacting with undercover reporters posing as business executives seeking to make contacts with the Kremlin. In the video, he assured the men that his close ties with the country would be of benefit, and that he could introduce them to high-ranking figures within the Russian government in exchange for money. The call took place the day after the European Union imposed sanctions on the Kremlin. Michael was being offered £143,000 for a proposal and £36,000 a month by the faux businessmen, which he expressed satisfaction with. The Marquess claimed that Michael was the Queen's "unofficial ambassador to Russia" and had direct access to Putin. He later stated that he had "overpromised", while the prince said that he had not had contact with Putin since 2003. In a 2019 interview, Michael stated that he visited Russia twice a year as part of his work for the Russo-British Chamber of Commerce.

Marina Litvinenko denounced the prince's actions, saying that it demonstrated that he didn't "care about human rights, democracy, about the people who are dying in Russia or what he did to your own citizens on UK soil". Conservative MP Bob Seely released a statement saying, in part: "We have sanctions against President Putin's regime for good reason. I'd love to know what Prince Michael thinks he is doing by making the UK's values and standards look optional."

Titles, styles, honours and arms

Titles

As a child of a younger son of a British sovereign, he is styled as a British prince with the prefix His Royal Highness and a territorial designation deriving from his father's dukedom: "His Royal Highness Prince Michael of Kent".

Unofficial
 Calabar, Nigeria
 2017present:
In Efik: Ada Idagha Ke Efik Eburutu
In English:  A person of honour and high standing in the Efik Eburutu Kingdom

Honours

  1953: Queen Elizabeth II Coronation Medal
  1977: Queen Elizabeth II Silver Jubilee Medal
  18 January 2001: Knight of Justice of the Most Venerable Order of Saint John (KStJ)
  2002: Queen Elizabeth II Golden Jubilee Medal
  2 June 2003: Knight Grand Cross of the Royal Victorian Order (GCVO)
 4 July 1992: Knight Commander of the Royal Victorian Order (KCVO)
  2012: Queen Elizabeth II Diamond Jubilee Medal
  19 October 2015: Canadian Forces Decoration (CD)
  2022: Queen Elizabeth II Platinum Jubilee Medal

Foreign
 : United Nations Medal for UNFICYP (1971)
 : Member of the Order of Friendship (4 November 2009 – 4 March 2022)
: Knight Grand Cross of the Royal Order of Francis I (19 August 2017)
 : Grand Cross of the Order of the Sun (2 November 1994)

Honorary military appointments
Canada
  Colonel-in-Chief, The Essex and Kent Scottish (14 November 2001 – present) 
United Kingdom
  Honorary Commodore, Royal Naval Reserve (1 April 1994 – 2004)
 Honorary Commodore, Maritime Volunteer Service
  Honorary Rear Admiral, Royal Naval Reserve (2004–2015)
  Honorary Vice Admiral, Royal Naval Reserve (9 March 2015 – present)
  Honorary Auxiliary Commodore, Royal Naval Auxiliary Service (1990)
  Commodore-in-Chief, Maritime Reserves (2006–present)
  Honorary Colonel, British Army (10 November 2010 – present)
  Senior Colonel, The King's Royal Hussars
  Regimental Colonel, Honourable Artillery Company (2009–2012)
  Royal Honorary Colonel, Honourable Artillery Company (31 January 2012 – present). (member since 1981)
  Honorary Air Commodore of RAF Benson (27 June 2002 – 2012)
  Honorary Air Marshal of RAF Benson (1 March 2012 – present)

Fellowships
Grand Master of the Order of Mark Master Masons of England
Chartered Institution of Highways and Transportation
Chartered Institute of Linguists
Royal Aeronautical Society
Society of Genealogists
Institute of Road Safety Officers
Institute of the Motor Industry

Honorary academic degrees and awards

Degrees and appointments
 1998: Plekhanov Economics Academy, Honorary Doctorate
 2003: Sinerghia Economics and Finance Institute, Honorary Professor
 2012: St Petersburg University of Humanities and Social Sciences, Honorary Doctorate

Awards
 2002: The International Man of the Year Award, Plekhanov Economics Academy
 2003: The "Glory of Russia", Plekhanov Economics Academy

Arms

Issue

Ancestry

See also
 List of British princes

Notes

References

External links

Prince Michael of Kent's official website
Prince and Princess Michael of Kent at the Royal Family website

1942 births
Living people
11th Hussars officers
British male bobsledders
British princes
Fellows of the Chartered Institute of Linguists
Freemasons of the United Grand Lodge of England
Graduates of the Mons Officer Cadet School
Honorary air commodores
House of Windsor
Knights Grand Cross of the Royal Victorian Order
Knights of Justice of the Order of St John
Interpreters
People educated at Eton College
People educated at Sunningdale School
People from South Bucks (district), Buckinghamshire
Princes of the United Kingdom
Royal Air Force officers holding honorary commissions
Royal Naval Reserve personnel
Royal Navy officers
Younger sons of dukes